Abzelilovo (Äbyälil) is a rural locality (a village) in Tashtimerovsky Selsoviet of Abzelilovsky District, Bashkortostan, Russia. The population was 496 as of 2010. There are 11 streets.

Geography 
Abzelilovo is located 21 km north of Askarovo (the district's administrative centre) by road. Tashtimerovo is the nearest rural locality.

Ethnicity 
The village is inhabited by Bashkirs and others.

References 

Rural localities in Abzelilovsky District